The Woofferton transmitting station is owned and operated by Encompass Digital Media, as one of the BBC's assets which were handed over as part of the privatization of World Service distribution and transmission in 1997. It is the last remaining UK shortwave broadcasting site, located at Woofferton, south of Ludlow, Shropshire, England. The large site spreads across into neighbouring Herefordshire.

The station was originally built by the BBC during World War II to house additional shortwave (HF) broadcasting transmitters. When it officially started broadcasting on 17 October 1943 it had six 50 kW RCA transmitters, obtained by lend-lease. The site has been modernised many times over the years and is now DRM (Digital Radio Mondiale) capable providing daily digital radio programmes. Woofferton is used to broadcast shortwave radio programmes on HF 4 MHz – 26 MHz to Europe, Russia, North/Central Africa, Middle East and South America for BBC World Service, Deutsche Welle, Voice of America, and Voice of Vietnam, among other international broadcasters. The site is also used for satellite communications and monitoring.

Construction
The site was built by J. L. Eve Construction during the Second World War, for short-wave transmissions across Europe.

Cold War era
During the Cold War, the station was equipped with six Marconi BD272 250 kW shortwave transmitters. Much of the capacity was leased by the BBC to the Voice of America (VoA) in order to enhance the latter's coverage in the Eastern Bloc. It provided a stronger shortwave broadcast signal into the Eastern Bloc than any other western shortwave broadcast transmitter during the years of Soviet jamming.

Privatisation
All the BBC's transmitting facilities were privatised in the 1990s. The shortwave sites were sold to Merlin Communications, which was acquired by VT Group plc trading under the name VT Communications until acquired by Babcock International Group in March 2010. Subsequently, Babcock's Media Services was acquired by global technology services company Encompass Digital Media in September 2018.

Transmitters
Woofferton Transmitting Station currently has ten HF transmitters. There are 3 × Riz 250 kW (installed 2007–2008), 1 × Riz 500 kW (installed 2006), 4 × 300 kW Marconi B6124s (installed 1980) and 2 × 250 kW Marconi BD272s (installed 1963). The Riz transmitters are Digital Radio Mondiale capable and transmit digital programmes on a daily basis for BBC World Service, NHK & KBS. It also has a 300-watt mediumwave (MW) transmitter for BBC Hereford and Worcester (formerly used by BBC Radio Shropshire), as well as a 1 kW VHF FM transmitter for local Ludlow commercial station Sunshine Radio.

Services available
Analogue radio (FM VHF)

Analogue radio (AM medium wave)

References 

 Campbell, D., 1983. War Plan UK, p. 251. Paladin edition. .
 Pawley, E., 1972. BBC Engineering 1922–1972, pp. 259–60, 348, 458. BBC. .
 Shacklady, N., and Ellen, M, 2003. On Air: A History of BBC Transmission, pp. 29–32. Wavechange Books. .

External links 

 Encompass Woofferton 
 Encompass Digital Media Services Woofferton Transmitting Station 
 Introduction to Woofferton Transmitting Station Part 1 
 Cant, J. Fifty years of transmitting at BBC Woofferton 1943–1993: A social and technical history of a Short Wave Station (3.7MB PDF)
 Woofferton's entry at mb21
 BBC Woofferton 60 years on

Buildings and structures in Shropshire
Cold War sites in the United Kingdom
History of Shropshire
Ludlow
Science and technology in Shropshire
Telecommunications in World War II
Transmitter sites in England
Shortwave radio stations